is a Japanese singer and rapper born in Tokyo. She started her career when one of her uploaded videos on Nico Nico Douga received attention at the age of 15 in 2012.

Career
The name Daoko (ダヲコ) was originally her web nickname.

Her first tour began on 15 January 2016 at Tsutaya O-East, Tokyo, Japan. Daoko was nominated for Next Break Artist at the MTV Video Music Awards Japan 2015.

She had caught the attention of multiple Japanese artists such as m-flo which lead to the collaboration of the two artist to produce her single "IRONY" in 2013 and was appointed as the theme song of the movie Eagle Talon – Beautiful Elliere Deodorant Plus (鷹の爪~美しきエリエール消臭プラス~).

Daoko released her first album, Hyper Girl, on 5 December 2012 through Low High Who? Production. She received a large amount of attention for her vocal work in the music video "ME!ME!ME!" composed by TeddyLoid on 21 November 2014. Daoko left Low High Who? Production after releasing her album Dimension on 4 February 2015 and subsequently shut down her blog.

In 2018, Daoko attended 69th NHK Kōhaku Uta Gassen.

Discography

Studio albums

Live albums

Extended plays

Singles

Promotional singles

Filmography

Film

Television

Awards

Performances 
 6 April 2015 – Party for first major album in Shibuya, Tokyo, Japan
 17 August 2015 – Live Solo in Shibuya, Tokyo, Japan
 14 September 2015 – Japanese Animation Trade Fair (Nico Nico Live)
 15 January 2016 – First Tour (Tsutaya O-East, Tokyo, Japan)
 8 March 2017 – Aoiro Jidai Tour (LIQUIDROOM in Ebisu, Tokyo, Japan)
 30 September 2017 – Anime Weekend Atlanta

Bibliography

References

External links 
 Official Blog 
 
 
 
 

1997 births
Living people
Japanese rappers
Singers from Tokyo
Toy's Factory artists
21st-century Japanese women singers
21st-century Japanese singers
Japanese hip hop singers
Japanese women in electronic music
Japanese women hip hop musicians